Gliese 229 (also written as Gl 229 or GJ 229) is a binary system composed of a red dwarf and the first brown dwarf seen by astronomers, 18.8 light years away in the constellation Lepus. The primary component has 58% of the mass of the Sun, 69% of the Sun's radius, and a very low projected rotation velocity of 1 km/s at the stellar equator.

The star is known to be a low activity flare star, which means it undergoes random increases in luminosity because of magnetic activity at the surface. The spectrum shows emission lines of calcium in the H and K bands. The emission of X-rays has been detected from the corona of this star. These may be caused by magnetic loops interacting with the gas of the star's outer atmosphere. No large-scale star spot activity has been detected.

The space velocity components of this star are U = +12, V = –11 and W = –12 km/s. The orbit of this star through the Milky Way galaxy has an eccentricity of 0.07 and an orbital inclination of 0.005.

Companions

Brown dwarf
A substellar companion was discovered in 1994 by Caltech astronomers Kulkarni, Tadashi Nakajima, Keith Matthews, and Rebecca Oppenheimer, and Johns Hopkins scientists Sam Durrance and David Golimowski. It was confirmed in 1995 as Gliese 229B, one of the first two instances of clear evidence for a brown dwarf, along with Teide 1. Although too small to sustain hydrogen-burning nuclear fusion as in a main sequence star, with a mass of around 40 to 60 times that of Jupiter (0.06 solar masses), it is still too massive to be a planet. As a brown dwarf, its core temperature is high enough to initiate the fusion of deuterium with a proton to form helium-3, but it is thought that it used up all its deuterium fuel long ago. This object has a surface temperature of 950 K.

The most recent parameters for Gliese 229 B as of 2022 come from a combination of data from radial velocity, astrometry, and imaging, showing that it is about 60.4 times the mass of Jupiter, and on an eccentric orbit with a semi-major axis of about 28.9 AU and an orbital period of about 217 years.

Planetary system
In March 2014, a super-Neptune mass planet candidate was announced in a much closer-in orbit around GJ 229. Given the proximity to the Sun, the orbit of GJ 229 Ab might be fully characterized by the Gaia space-astrometry mission or via direct imaging. In 2020, a super-Earth mass planet was discovered around GJ 229. GJ 229 Ac orbits the star closer in than GJ 229 Ab, located towards the outer edge but still well inside the star's habitable zone and in that sense similar to Mars in our own Solar System. While considering GJ 229 Ab an unconfirmed candidate, the study estimated a significantly lower minimum mass for it. , most sources consider both planets to be confirmed.

If the planets Gliese 229 Ab & c orbit in the same plane as the brown dwarf Gliese 229 B, their true masses would be significantly greater than their minimum masses, making them both super-Neptunes nearly as massive as Saturn.

References

Notes

External links 

Brown dwarfs (NASA)

Binary stars
Flare stars
0229
Lepus (constellation)
M-type main-sequence stars
T-type stars
042581
?
Durchmusterung objects
029295
Planetary systems with two confirmed planets
TIC objects